A special election for three judges of the International Criminal Court was held during the 6th session of the Assembly of States Parties to the Rome Statute of the International Criminal Court in New York on 30 November and 3 December 2007.

The election was to replace three judges who had resigned during 2006 and 2007.

Background 
The judges elected at this election took office on the date of their elections. Two were to remain in office until 10 March 2012, one judge (to be chosen by drawing of lots) until 10 March 2009.

The election was governed by the Rome Statute of the International Criminal Court. Its article 36(8)(a) states that "[t]he States Parties shall, in the selection of judges, take into account the need, within the membership of the Court, for:
 (i) The representation of the principal legal systems of the world;
 (ii) Equitable geographical representation; and
 (iii) A fair representation of female and male judges."

Furthermore, article 36(3)(b) and 36(5) provide for two lists:
 List A contains those judges that "[h]ave established competence in criminal law and procedure, and the necessary relevant experience, whether as judge, prosecutor, advocate or in other similar capacity, in criminal proceedings";
 List B contains those who "[h]ave established competence in relevant areas of international law such as international humanitarian law and the law of human rights, and extensive experience in a professional legal capacity which is of relevance to the judicial work of the Court".

Each candidate must belong to exactly one list.

Further rules of election were adopted by a resolution of the Assembly of States Parties in 2004.

Nomination process 
Following these rules, the nomination period of judges for the 2007 election lasted from 1 June to 24 August 2007. The following persons were nominated:

The candidature of Sunday Akinola Akintan of Nigeria was withdrawn.

Minimum voting requirements 
Minimum voting requirements governed part of the election. This was to ensure that article 36(8)(a) cited above is fulfilled. For this election, the following minimum voting requirements existed; they were to be adjusted once the election was underway.

Regarding the List A or B requirement, there was a minimum voting requirement (not to be waived at any time) of two judges from List A .

Regarding the regional criteria, there was no minimum voting requirement.

Regarding the gender criteria, there was no minimum voting requirement.

The regional and gender criteria could have been adjusted even before the election depending on the number of candidates. Paragraph 20(b) of the ASP resolution that governed the elections states that if there are less than double the number of candidates required for each region, the minimum voting requirement shall be a (rounded-up) half of the number of candidates; except when there is only one candidate which results in no voting requirement. Furthermore, if the number of candidates of one gender is less than ten, then the minimum voting requirement shall not exceed a certain number depending on the number of candidates.

The regional and gender criteria could have been dropped either if they were not (jointly) possible any more, or if after four ballots not all seats were filled.

The voting requirements were as follows:

Ballots 
The first two ballots took place on 30 November 2007. The other two ballots took place on 3 December 2007.

The drawing of lots had Saiga serve until 2009 and Cotte and Nsereko until 2012.

References

 Election,2007
2007 elections
Non-partisan elections
2007
2007 in New York City